Ghobad Shiva (born 1940 in Hamadan, Iran) is an Iranian graphic designer.

Career 
He graduated in 1966 from the Faculty of Fine Arts of the University of Tehran. He then spent several years acquiring practical experience in graphic art before earning a master's degree from Pratt University, New York City, in 1980. Then after creating original works over several decades, he achieved graphic art with an Iranian flavor, which indeed prompted museums and collectors across the world to add his works to their collections.

His secondary activities included the establishment of graphic art sections for the Iranian radio and TV in 1968 and for Soroush Publisher in 1971. He was also one of the co-founders of the Iranian graphic designer society "IGDS", an artist advisor and jury member of the Iranian graphic art Biennal.

He has also been teaching in eminent art faculties in Tehran since 1976.

All along his schooling years and professional career, he has held exhibitions of his paintings, photographers, and, particularly, graphic works in Iran and abroad, notably in England, France, and the United States. His works have been repeatedly selected and reproduced in international graphic art periodicals and specialized books.

He is a member of the Society of Alliance Graphique Internationale (AGI) and is presently busy directing his own institution, offering artistic management and advisory services, as well as designing environmental projects and exhibition areas. The referenced book comprises a selection of posters he has created in different decades.

References 
 Shiva, Ghobad. Ghobad Shiva Art Director & Graphic Designer. Tehran, Iran: Nazar cultural & researching institute, 2005 .

External links 
 Official Web site
  Ghobad Shiva in Knowledge Island

1940 births
Iranian academics
Iranian graphic designers
Living people
People from Hamadan
University of Tehran alumni
Iranian poster artists
Album-cover and concert-poster artists